The Chicago Painter was an ancient Greek vase painter, active in Athens, Greece, in the middle of the 5th century BCE. His real name is unknown, but like many other ancient Greek vase painters, his style was recognized in several works by the British classical archaeologist and international authority of Attic Greek vases, Sir John Beazley (1885–1970). Beazley was exceptionally talented at identifying the individual signature styles of different Greek painters, which could be recognized in something as subtle as the composition of eyes, noses, or hands. 

The Chicago Painter was one of many ancient Greek painters identified by Beazley, who first identified this stamnos to the artist in his 1918 publication Attic Red-Figured Vases in American Museums. The painter was originally called the “Painter of the Chicago Stamnos,” which was shortened to the “Chicago Painter.” His "name vase" is this large stamnos (mixing jar) that was acquired by the Art Institute of Chicago in 1889 and was the first example of his work to be identified. The Chicago Painter was a follower  of the Villa Giulia Painter (a painter named after a distinct vase in the Villa Giulia Museum in Rome, Italy) and he had a preference for depicting elegant and tender scenes where the figures are calm and focused on their individual tasks. The stamnos at the Art Institute, along with others that the Chicago Painter decorated, depicts scenes likely related to the cult of the wine god Dionysos, and highlights his uncluttered, elegant signature style.

References 

Ancient Greek art
Painting
Archaeology